Podpłomyk (German: fladen; , perepichka, підпалок, pidpalok) is a simple kind of flat bread, often made without yeast.

Podpłomyk was a common kind of food in ancient Slavic societies, where it was made on stones heated up in a fire. Podpłomyki were also made in newer times by those who could not afford an enclosed stove. Before the mid-19th century, many poor Polish peasant homes had only open fireplaces, and the "thick" bread required careful heating in an oven; to overcome the problem, such ovens were sometimes communally-owned. Now podpłomyk, actually having never fully disappeared, has become popular again due to the interest in (pre-) medieval everyday life. Made of flour, water and salt, podpłomyki are often eaten with honey or "konfitury" (a kind of jam). Sometimes a podpłomyk was made to test the temperature of the baker's oven before the first batch of bread was made.

References

Flatbreads
Polish cuisine
Unleavened breads